Fifth World can mean:

 Fifth World (Native American mythology)
 Fifth World (comics), the successor to Jack Kirby's Fourth World in DC Comics
 Micronations

See also
 World
 Other numbered "worlds":
 First World
 Second World
 Third World (disambiguation)
 Fourth World (disambiguation)
 Sixth World
 Seventh Heaven (disambiguation)